The History of Economics Society (HES) is a learned society in the field of the history of economics and economic methodology, which was formally established in May 1974. Since its creation, the HES has served an international community.

The HES publishes a quarterly peer-reviewed academic journal that began in 1979 as the History of Economics Bulletin and was renamed the Journal of the History of Economic Thought in 1990.

The HES also offers several grants for researchers working on the history of economics such as the and the  In addition, the HES offers online resources for historians and general information on the history of economics community, including graduate programs and course materials. In conjunction with other history of economics societies, the HES maintains SHOE, a free, moderated electronic mailing list with over 1,000 subscribers.

Past Presidents (1974-2019)

References

External links
 
 SHOE list

History of economic thought
Learned societies of the United States
1974 establishments in the United States